Amaravila is a village in Neyyattinkara town in Trivandrum district, Kerala State, India.  Kerala's second largest checkpost after Walayar is situated in Amaravila. This village is situated in NH 47 on the way to Kanyakumari, on the Kerala-Tamil Nadu border. 

Amaravila CSI church or CSI Amaravila, founded in 1810 and known in those days as Emily Chapel, an old Anglican Church (Anglican Communion), is one of the main attractions of this village.

See also
 Neyyattinkara
 Neyyattinkara Railway Station
 Neyyattinkara Sree Krishna Swami Temple
 Thiruvananthapuram
 Municipalities of Kerala
 Upper cloth revolt

References

Villages in Thiruvananthapuram district